Pir Chinasi (also spelled as Peer Chinasi) is a shrine and a tourist destination located about  east of Muzaffarabad, the capital city of Azad Kashmir administered by Pakistan. The mountain peak has gained large fame for its ziyarat of a famous saint, Sayed Hussain Shah Bukhari.

This place is also visited by tourists, for the view of Muzaffarabad and rural areas around the hidden city. The area is also famous for paragliding and snow cross jeep rallies.

References

Muzaffarabad District
Tourist attractions in Azad Kashmir